Anne Terrier Laffaille (22 July 1904 – 22 December 1971) was a French composer and founding member of Groupe Melos.

Terrier Laffaille was born in Laval. She studied music with Vincent d'Indy at the Schola Cantorum de Paris. In 1950, Terrier Laffaille joined Robert Caby and Marcel Despard to form Groupe Melos. The group adopted Erik Satie's motto "our music is guaranteed playable." Its manifesto stated "enough intellectual esthetics, enough scholarly [pedanticism], down with modern music, down with music for technique's sake, long live music for the people!" Supported by composers Francis Poulenc and Henri Sauguet, Groupe Melos presented one concert, then faded away.

Terrier Laffaille's music was published by Charles Mayol, Éditions Alphonse Leduc, and Gauthier. Her compositions include:

Orchestra 

Prelude pour la Mort de la Terre

Piano 

Derniers Murmures du Soir

Et Comment (polka-march)

Italie en Deuil

Marche des Insoouciants

Menuet Bleu

Mogador (march)

Sonata

Vocal 

"C'est la Femme"

"Ca r'vient Cher"

"Comprendre"

"Convoi"

"Filial Amour"

"Je suis Marcheuse"

"Ou Donc Tu Vas?"

"Tres Content!"

References 

French women composers
1904 births
1971 deaths